Gislaveds IS is a Swedish football club located in Gislaved in Jönköping County.

Background
Gislaveds Idrottssällskap was formed in Gislaved as a sports club in 1903.  The club has mainly been successful in football and currently has men's and ladies sides supported by one of Småland's largest youth sections.

Since their foundation Gislaveds IS has participated mainly in the middle divisions of the Swedish football league system.  The club currently plays in Division 2 Västra Svealand which is the fourth tier of Swedish football. They play their home matches at the Ryttarvallen in Gislaved.  The complex has 5 full size pitches and an indoor hall with a 70 metres by 40 metres artificial grass pitch.

Gislaveds IS are affiliated to the Smålands Fotbollförbund.

Season to season

Attendances

In recent seasons Gislaveds IS have had the following average attendances:

The club's attendance record is around 1500 spectators and was for a match against FK Jat who were defeated 5–0. The spectators consisted of more than 800 paying customers and around 700 children under 16 with free admission.

Footnotes

External links
 Gislaveds IS – Official website

Sport in Jönköping County
Football clubs in Jönköping County
Association football clubs established in 1903
1903 establishments in Sweden